The Buckinghamshire Women's cricket team is the women's representative cricket team for the English historic county of Buckinghamshire. They play their home games across the county, and are captained by Izzy Gurney. They consistently played in the bottom tier of the Women's County Championship until the competition ended, and they now play only in the Women's Twenty20 Cup. They are partnered with the regional side Southern Vipers.

History

1936-2008: Early History
The first recorded match involving Buckinghamshire Women took place in 1936, in which they beat Berkshire Women by 66 runs. Over the following years, Buckinghamshire played various one-off matches against nearby sides, such as Surrey and Middlesex.

2009- : Women's County Championship
Buckinghamshire Women joined the Women's Twenty20 Cup for its inaugural season in 2009, in which they finished 3rd in Division Eight, with one win. In 2010, Buckinghamshire Women joined the Women's County Championship, finishing bottom of Division 5 South & West. They fared better in the Twenty20 Cup, however, finishing second in their division before losing the Division Final to Wiltshire; in 2011 and 2012, Buckinghamshire again lost Division Finals, after topping the group in both years. In subsequent years, Buckinghamshire have been one of the poorer performers across the two competitions, although they did earn promotion in the Twenty20 Cup in 2014 before being relegated the following season. In 2019, the final season before a restructuring of women's county cricket, Buckinghamshire achieved one of their best seasons, finishing second in their division in both the County Championship and the Twenty20 Cup. In 2020, they competed in the East of England Championship, and won the T20 competition. In 2021, they competed in the East Group of the Twenty20 Cup, finishing second with 4 wins, as well as again competing in the East of England Championship, where they won the 45-over competition. The side withdrew from the East of England Championship in 2022, as well as finishing 3rd in their Twenty20 Cup group. They also joined the South Central Counties Cup in 2022, finishing fourth out of six teams in the inaugural edition.

Players

Current squad
Based on appearances in the 2022 season.

Notable players
Players who have played for Buckinghamshire and played internationally are listed below, in order of first international appearance (given in brackets):

 Joy Partridge (1934)
 Joan Hawes (1957)
 Rosemary Goodchild (1966)
 Janet Godman (1991)
 Elspeth Fowler (2022)

Seasons

Women's County Championship

Women's Twenty20 Cup

See also
 Buckinghamshire County Cricket Club
 Southern Vipers

References

Cricket in Buckinghamshire
Women's cricket teams in England